A touchscreen or touch screen is the assembly of both an input ('touch panel') and output ('display') device. The touch panel is normally layered on the top of an electronic visual display of an electronic device.

The display is often an LCD, AMOLED or OLED display.

A user can give input or control the information processing system through simple or multi-touch gestures by touching the screen with a special stylus or one or more fingers. Some touchscreens use ordinary or specially coated gloves to work, while others may only work using a special stylus or pen. The user can use the touchscreen to react to what is displayed and, if the software allows, to control how it is displayed; for example, zooming to increase the text size.

The touchscreen enables the user to interact directly with what is displayed, rather than using a mouse, touchpad, or other such devices (other than a stylus, which is optional for most modern touchscreens).

Touchscreens are common in devices such as smartphones, handheld game consoles, personal computers, electronic voting machines, automated teller machines and point-of-sale (POS) systems. They can also be attached to computers or, as terminals, to networks. They play a prominent role in the design of digital appliances such as personal digital assistants (PDAs) and some e-readers. Touchscreens are also important in educational settings such as classrooms or on college campuses.

The popularity of smartphones, tablets, and many types of information appliances is driving the demand and acceptance of common touchscreens for portable and functional electronics. Touchscreens are found in the medical field, heavy industry, automated teller machines (ATMs), and kiosks such as museum displays or room automation, where keyboard and mouse systems do not allow a suitably intuitive, rapid, or accurate interaction by the user with the display's content.

Historically, the touchscreen sensor and its accompanying controller-based firmware have been made available by a wide array of after-market system integrators, and not by display, chip, or motherboard manufacturers. Display manufacturers and chip manufacturers have acknowledged the trend toward acceptance of touchscreens as a user interface component and have begun to integrate touchscreens into the fundamental design of their products.

History

One predecessor of the modern touch screen includes stylus based systems. In 1946, a patent was filed by Philco Company for a stylus designed for sports telecasting which, when placed against an intermediate cathode ray tube display (CRT) would amplify and add to the original signal. Later inventions built upon this system to free telewriting styli from their mechanical bindings. By transcribing what a user draws onto a computer, it could be saved for future use. See .

The first version of a touchscreen which operated independently of the light produced from the screen was patented by AT&T Corporation . This touchscreen utilized a matrix of collimated lights shining orthogonally across the touch surface. When a beam is interrupted by a stylus, the photodetectors which no longer are receiving a signal can be used to determine where the interruption is. Later iterations of matrix based touchscreens built upon this by adding more emitters and detectors to improve resolution, pulsing emitters to improve optical signal to noise ratio, and a nonorthogonal matrix to remove shadow readings when using multi-touch.

The first finger driven touch screen was developed by Eric Johnson, of the Royal Radar Establishment located in Malvern, England, who described his work on capacitive touchscreens in a short article published in 1965 and then more fully—with photographs and diagrams—in an article published in 1967. The application of touch technology for air traffic control was described in an article published in 1968. Frank Beck and Bent Stumpe, engineers from CERN (European Organization for Nuclear Research), developed a transparent touchscreen in the early 1970s, based on Stumpe's work at a television factory in the early 1960s. Then manufactured by CERN, and shortly after by industry partners, it was put to use in 1973.
In 1970, this evolved into a device named "Touchinput-" ("touch input facility") for the SIG 50 terminal utilizing a conductively coated glass screen in front of the display. This was patented in 1971 and the patent was granted a couple of years later. The same team had already invented and marketed the  mouse RKS 100-86 for the SIG 100-86 a couple of years earlier.

In 1972, a group at the University of Illinois filed for a patent on an optical touchscreen that became a standard part of the Magnavox Plato IV Student Terminal and thousands were built for this purpose. These touchscreens had a crossed array of 16×16 infrared position sensors, each composed of an LED on one edge of the screen and a matched phototransistor on the other edge, all mounted in front of a monochrome plasma display panel. This arrangement could sense any fingertip-sized opaque object in close proximity to the screen. A similar touchscreen was used on the HP-150 starting in 1983. The HP 150 was one of the world's earliest commercial touchscreen computers. HP mounted their infrared transmitters and receivers around the bezel of a 9-inch Sony cathode ray tube (CRT).

In 1977, an American company, Elographics – in partnership with Siemens – began work on developing a transparent implementation of an existing opaque touchpad technology, U.S. patent  3,911,215, October 7, 1975, which had been developed by Elographics' founder George Samuel Hurst. The resulting resistive technology touch screen was first shown on the World's Fair at Knoxville in 1982.

In 1984, Fujitsu released a touch pad for the Micro 16 to accommodate the complexity of kanji characters, which were stored as tiled graphics. In 1985, Sega released the Terebi Oekaki, also known as the Sega Graphic Board, for the SG-1000 video game console and SC-3000 home computer. It consisted of a plastic pen and a plastic board with a transparent window where pen presses are detected. It was used primarily with a drawing software application. A graphic touch tablet was released for the Sega AI computer in 1986.

Touch-sensitive control-display units (CDUs) were evaluated for commercial aircraft flight decks in the early 1980s. Initial research showed that a touch interface would reduce pilot workload as the crew could then select waypoints, functions and actions, rather than be "head down" typing latitudes, longitudes, and waypoint codes on a keyboard. An effective integration of this technology was aimed at helping flight crews maintain a high level of situational awareness of all major aspects of the vehicle operations including the flight path, the functioning of various aircraft systems, and moment-to-moment human interactions.

In the early 1980s, General Motors tasked its Delco Electronics division with a project aimed at replacing an automobile's non-essential functions (i.e. other than throttle, transmission, braking, and steering) from mechanical or electro-mechanical systems with solid state alternatives wherever possible. The finished device was dubbed the ECC for "Electronic Control Center", a digital computer and software control system hardwired to various peripheral sensors, servos, solenoids, antenna and a monochrome CRT touchscreen that functioned both as display and sole method of input. The ECC replaced the traditional mechanical stereo, fan, heater and air conditioner controls and displays, and was capable of providing very detailed and specific information about the vehicle's cumulative and current operating status in real time. The ECC was standard equipment on the 1985–1989 Buick Riviera and later the 1988–1989 Buick Reatta, but was unpopular with consumers—partly due to the technophobia of some traditional Buick customers, but mostly because of costly technical problems suffered by the ECC's touchscreen which would render climate control or stereo operation impossible.

Multi-touch technology began in 1982, when the University of Toronto's Input Research Group developed the first human-input multi-touch system, using a frosted-glass panel with a camera placed behind the glass. In 1985, the University of Toronto group, including Bill Buxton, developed a multi-touch tablet that used capacitance rather than bulky camera-based optical sensing systems (see History of multi-touch).

The first commercially available graphical point-of-sale (POS) software was demonstrated on the 16-bit Atari 520ST color computer. It featured a color touchscreen widget-driven interface.  The ViewTouch POS software was first shown by its developer, Gene Mosher, at the Atari Computer demonstration area of the Fall COMDEX expo in 1986.

In 1987, Casio launched the Casio PB-1000 pocket computer with a touchscreen consisting of a 4×4 matrix, resulting in 16 touch areas in its small LCD graphic screen.

Touchscreens had a bad reputation of being imprecise until 1988. Most user-interface books would state that touchscreen selections were limited to targets larger than the average finger. At the time, selections were done in such a way that a target was selected as soon as the finger came over it, and the corresponding action was performed immediately. Errors were common, due to parallax or calibration problems, leading to user frustration. "Lift-off strategy" was introduced by researchers at the University of Maryland Human–Computer Interaction Lab (HCIL). As users touch the screen, feedback is provided as to what will be selected: users can adjust the position of the finger, and the action takes place only when the finger is lifted off the screen. This allowed the selection of small targets, down to a single pixel on a 640×480 Video Graphics Array (VGA) screen (a standard of that time).

Sears et al. (1990) gave a review of academic research on single and multi-touch human–computer interaction of the time, describing gestures such as rotating knobs, adjusting sliders, and swiping the screen to activate a switch (or a U-shaped gesture for a toggle switch). The HCIL team developed and studied small touchscreen keyboards (including a study that showed users could type at 25  on a touchscreen keyboard), aiding their introduction on mobile devices. They also designed and implemented multi-touch gestures such as selecting a range of a line, connecting objects, and a "tap-click" gesture to select while maintaining location with another finger.

In 1990, HCIL demonstrated a touchscreen slider, which was later cited as prior art in the lock screen patent litigation between Apple and other touchscreen mobile phone vendors (in relation to ).

In 1991–1992, the Sun Star7 prototype PDA implemented a touchscreen with inertial scrolling. In 1993, IBM released the IBM Simon the first touchscreen phone.

An early attempt at a handheld game console with touchscreen controls was Sega's intended successor to the Game Gear, though the device was ultimately shelved and never released due to the expensive cost of touchscreen technology in the early 1990s.

The first mobile phone with a capacitive touchscreen was LG Prada released in May 2007 (which was before the first iPhone). By 2009, touchscreen-enabled mobile phones were becoming trendy and quickly gaining popularity in both basic and advanced devices. In Q4 2009 for the first time, a majority of smartphones (i.e. not all mobile phones) shipped with touchscreens over non-touch.

Touchscreens would not be popularly used for video games until the release of the Nintendo DS in 2004. Until recently, most consumer touchscreens could only sense one point of contact at a time, and few have had the capability to sense how hard one is touching. This has changed with the commercialization of multi-touch technology, and the Apple Watch being released with a force-sensitive display in April 2015.

In 2007, 93% of touchscreens shipped were resistive and only 4% were projected capacitance. In 2013, 3% of touchscreens shipped were resistive and 90% were projected capacitance.

Technologies
There is a variety of touchscreen technologies with different methods of sensing touch.

Resistive

A resistive touchscreen panel comprises several thin layers, the most important of which are two transparent electrically resistive layers facing each other with a thin gap between. The top layer (that which is touched) has a coating on the underside surface; just beneath it is a similar resistive layer on top of its substrate. One layer has conductive connections along its sides, the other along top and bottom. A voltage is applied to one layer and sensed by the other. When an object, such as a fingertip or stylus tip, presses down onto the outer surface, the two layers touch to become connected at that point. The panel then behaves as a pair of voltage dividers, one axis at a time. By rapidly switching between each layer, the position of pressure on the screen can be detected.

Resistive touch is used in restaurants, factories and hospitals due to its high tolerance for liquids and contaminants. A major benefit of resistive-touch technology is its low cost. Additionally, as only sufficient pressure is necessary for the touch to be sensed, they may be used with gloves on, or by using anything rigid as a finger substitute. Disadvantages include the need to press down, and a risk of damage by sharp objects. Resistive touchscreens also suffer from poorer contrast, due to having additional reflections (i.e. glare) from the layers of material placed over the screen. This is the type of touchscreen that was used by Nintendo in the DS family, the 3DS family, and the Wii U GamePad.

Surface acoustic wave

Surface acoustic wave (SAW) technology uses ultrasonic waves that pass over the touchscreen panel. When the panel is touched, a portion of the wave is absorbed. The change in ultrasonic waves is processed by the controller to determine the position of the touch event. Surface acoustic wave touchscreen panels can be damaged by outside elements. Contaminants on the surface can also interfere with the functionality of the touchscreen.

SAW devices have a wide range of applications, including delay lines, filters, correlators and DC to DC converters.

Capacitive

A capacitive touchscreen panel consists of an insulator, such as glass, coated with a transparent conductor, such as indium tin oxide (ITO). As the human body is also an electrical conductor, touching the surface of the screen results in a distortion of the screen's electrostatic field, measurable as a change in capacitance. Different technologies may be used to determine the location of the touch. The location is then sent to the controller for processing. Touchscreens that use silver instead of ITO exist, as ITO causes several environmental problems due to the use of indium. The controller is typically a complementary metal–oxide–semiconductor (CMOS) application-specific integrated circuit (ASIC) chip, which in turn usually sends the signals to a CMOS digital signal processor (DSP) for processing.

Unlike a resistive touchscreen, some capacitive touchscreens cannot be used to detect a finger through electrically insulating material, such as gloves. This disadvantage especially affects usability in consumer electronics, such as touch tablet PCs and capacitive smartphones in cold weather when people may be wearing gloves. It can be overcome with a special capacitive stylus, or a special-application glove with an embroidered patch of conductive thread allowing electrical contact with the user's fingertip.

A low-quality switching-mode power supply unit with an accordingly unstable, noisy voltage may temporarily interfere with the precision, accuracy and sensitivity of capacitive touch screens.

Some capacitive display manufacturers continue to develop thinner and more accurate touchscreens. Those for mobile devices are now being produced with 'in-cell' technology, such as in Samsung's Super AMOLED screens, that eliminates a layer by building the capacitors inside the display itself. This type of touchscreen reduces the visible distance between the user's finger and what the user is touching on the screen, reducing the thickness and weight of the display, which is desirable in smartphones.

A simple parallel-plate capacitor has two conductors separated by a dielectric layer. Most of the energy in this system is concentrated directly between the plates. Some of the energy spills over into the area outside the plates, and the electric field lines associated with this effect are called fringing fields. Part of the challenge of making a practical capacitive sensor is to design a set of printed circuit traces which direct fringing fields into an active sensing area accessible to a user. A parallel-plate capacitor is not a good choice for such a sensor pattern. Placing a finger near fringing electric fields adds conductive surface area to the capacitive system. The additional charge storage capacity added by the finger is known as finger capacitance, or CF. The capacitance of the sensor without a finger present is known as parasitic capacitance, or CP.

Surface capacitance
In this basic technology, only one side of the insulator is coated with a conductive layer. A small voltage is applied to the layer, resulting in a uniform electrostatic field. When a conductor, such as a human finger, touches the uncoated surface, a capacitor is dynamically formed. The sensor's controller can determine the location of the touch indirectly from the change in the capacitance as measured from the four corners of the panel. As it has no moving parts, it is moderately durable but has limited resolution, is prone to false signals from parasitic capacitive coupling, and needs calibration during manufacture. It is therefore most often used in simple applications such as industrial controls and kiosks.

Although some standard capacitance detection methods are projective, in the sense that they can be used to detect a finger through a non-conductive surface, they are very sensitive to fluctuations in temperature, which expand or contract the sensing plates, causing fluctuations in the capacitance of these plates. These fluctuations result in a lot of background noise, so a strong finger signal is required for accurate detection. This limits applications to those where the finger directly touches the sensing element or is sensed through a relatively thin non-conductive surface.

Projected capacitance

Projected capacitive touch (PCT; also PCAP) technology is a variant of capacitive touch technology but where sensitivity to touch, accuracy, resolution and speed of touch have been greatly improved by the use of a simple form of
"Artificial Intelligence".  This intelligent processing enables finger sensing to be projected, accurately and reliably, through very thick glass and even double glazing.

Some modern PCT touch screens are composed of thousands of discrete keys, but most PCT touch screens are made of an x/y  matrix of rows and columns of conductive material, layered on sheets of glass.
This can be done either by etching a single conductive layer to form a grid pattern of electrodes,  by etching two separate, perpendicular layers of conductive material with parallel lines or tracks to form a grid, or by forming an x/y grid of fine, insulation coated wires in a single layer . The number of fingers that can be detected simultaneously is determined by the number of cross-over points (x * y) . However, the number of cross-over points can be almost doubled by using a diagonal lattice layout, where, instead of x elements only ever crossing y elements,  each conductive element crosses every other element .

"Infinitely" wide touchscreens are possible, when using diagonal wiring, due to the fact that track lengths can be independent of touchscreen width.
   
The conductive layer is often transparent, being made of Indium tin oxide (ITO), a transparent electrical conductor.
In some designs, voltage applied to this grid creates a uniform electrostatic field, which can be measured. When a conductive object, such as a finger, comes into contact with a PCT panel, it distorts the local electrostatic field at that point. This is measurable as a change in capacitance. If a finger bridges the gap between two of the "tracks", the charge field is further interrupted and detected by the controller. The capacitance can be changed and measured at every individual point on the grid. This system is able to accurately track touches.

Due to the top layer of a PCT being glass, it is sturdier than less-expensive resistive touch technology.
Unlike traditional capacitive touch technology, it is possible for a PCT system to sense a passive stylus or gloved finger. However, moisture on the surface of the panel, high humidity, or collected dust can interfere with performance.
These environmental factors, however, are not a problem with 'fine wire' based touchscreens due to the fact that wire based touchscreens have a much lower 'parasitic' capacitance, and there is greater distance between neighbouring conductors.

There are two types of PCT: mutual capacitance and self-capacitance.

Mutual capacitance
This is a common PCT approach, which makes use of the fact that most conductive objects are able to hold a charge if they are very close together. In mutual capacitive sensors, a capacitor is inherently formed by the row trace and column trace at each intersection of the grid. A 16×14 array, for example, would have 224 independent capacitors. A voltage is applied to the rows or columns. Bringing a finger or conductive stylus close to the surface of the sensor changes the local electrostatic field, which in turn reduces the mutual capacitance. The capacitance change at every individual point on the grid can be measured to accurately determine the touch location by measuring the voltage in the other axis. Mutual capacitance allows multi-touch operation where multiple fingers, palms or styli can be accurately tracked at the same time.

Self-capacitance
Self-capacitance sensors can have the same X-Y grid as mutual capacitance sensors, but the columns and rows operate independently. With self-capacitance, the capacitive load of a finger is measured on each column or row electrode by a current meter, or the change in frequency of an RC oscillator.

A finger may be detected anywhere along the whole length of a row.  
If that finger is also detected by a column, then it can be assumed that the finger position is at the intersection of this row/column pair.
This allows for the speedy and accurate detection of a single finger, but it causes some ambiguity if more than one finger is to be detected.

Two fingers may have four possible detection positions, only two of which are true. However, by selectively de-sensitizing any touch-points in contention, conflicting results are easily eliminated.  This enables "Self Capacitance" to be used for multi-touch operation.

Alternatively, ambiguity can be avoided by applying a "de-sensitizing" signal to all but one of the columns . 
This leaves just a short section of any row sensitive to touch. By selecting a sequence of these sections along the row, it is possible to determine the accurate position of multiple fingers along that row. This process can then be repeated for all the other rows until the whole screen has been scanned.

Self-capacitive touch screen layers are used on mobile phones such as the Sony Xperia Sola, the Samsung Galaxy S4, Galaxy Note 3, Galaxy S5, and Galaxy Alpha.

Self capacitance is far more sensitive than mutual capacitance and is mainly used for single touch, simple gesturing and proximity sensing where the finger does not even have to touch the glass surface.
Mutual capacitance is mainly used for multitouch applications.

Many touchscreen manufacturers use both self and mutual capacitance technologies in the same product, thereby combining their individual benefits.

Use of stylus on capacitive screens
Capacitive touchscreens do not necessarily need to be operated by a finger, but until recently the special styli required could be quite expensive to purchase. The cost of this technology has fallen greatly in recent years and capacitive styli are now widely available for a nominal charge, and often given away free with mobile accessories. These consist of an electrically conductive shaft with a soft conductive rubber tip, thereby resistively connecting the fingers to the tip of the stylus.

Infrared grid

An infrared touchscreen uses an array of X-Y infrared LED and photodetector pairs around the edges of the screen to detect a disruption in the pattern of LED beams. These LED beams cross each other in vertical and horizontal patterns. This helps the sensors pick up the exact location of the touch. A major benefit of such a system is that it can detect essentially any opaque object including a finger, gloved finger, stylus or pen. It is generally used in outdoor applications and POS systems that cannot rely on a conductor (such as a bare finger) to activate the touchscreen. Unlike capacitive touchscreens, infrared touchscreens do not require any patterning on the glass which increases durability and optical clarity of the overall system. Infrared touchscreens are sensitive to dirt and dust that can interfere with the infrared beams, and suffer from parallax in curved surfaces and accidental press when the user hovers a finger over the screen while searching for the item to be selected.

Infrared acrylic projection
A translucent acrylic sheet is used as a rear-projection screen to display information.  The edges of the acrylic sheet are illuminated by infrared LEDs, and infrared cameras are focused on the back of the sheet.  Objects placed on the sheet are detectable by the cameras.  When the sheet is touched by the user, frustrated total internal reflection results in leakage of infrared light which peaks at the points of maximum pressure, indicating the user's touch location.  Microsoft's PixelSense tablets use this technology.

Optical imaging
Optical touchscreens are a relatively modern development in touchscreen technology, in which two or more image sensors (such as CMOS sensors) are placed around the edges (mostly the corners) of the screen. Infrared backlights are placed in the sensor's field of view on the opposite side of the screen. A touch blocks some lights from the sensors, and the location and size of the touching object can be calculated (see visual hull). This technology is growing in popularity due to its scalability, versatility, and affordability for larger touchscreens.

Dispersive signal technology
Introduced in 2002 by 3M, this system detects a touch by using sensors to measure the piezoelectricity in the glass. Complex algorithms interpret this information and provide the actual location of the touch. The technology is unaffected by dust and other outside elements, including scratches. Since there is no need for additional elements on screen, it also claims to provide excellent optical clarity. Any object can be used to generate touch events, including gloved fingers. A downside is that after the initial touch, the system cannot detect a motionless finger.  However, for the same reason, resting objects do not disrupt touch recognition.

Acoustic pulse recognition
The key to this technology is that a touch at any one position on the surface generates a sound wave in the substrate which then produces a unique combined signal as measured by three or more tiny transducers attached to the edges of the touchscreen. The digitized signal is compared to a list corresponding to every position on the surface, determining the touch location. A moving touch is tracked by rapid repetition of this process. Extraneous and ambient sounds are ignored since they do not match any stored sound profile. The technology differs from other sound-based technologies by using a simple look-up method rather than expensive signal-processing hardware. As with the dispersive signal technology system, a motionless finger cannot be detected after the initial touch. However, for the same reason, the touch recognition is not disrupted by any resting objects. The technology was created by SoundTouch Ltd in the early 2000s, as described by the patent family EP1852772, and introduced to the market by Tyco International's Elo division in 2006 as Acoustic Pulse Recognition. The touchscreen used by Elo is made of ordinary glass, giving good durability and optical clarity. The technology usually retains accuracy with scratches and dust on the screen. The technology is also well suited to displays that are physically larger.

Construction

There are several principal ways to build a touchscreen. The key goals are to recognize one or more fingers touching a display, to interpret the command that this represents, and to communicate the command to the appropriate application.

In the resistive approach, which used to be the most popular technique, there are typically four layers:
 Top polyester-coated layer with a transparent metallic-conductive coating on the bottom.
 Adhesive spacer
 Glass layer coated with a transparent metallic-conductive coating on the top
 Adhesive layer on the backside of the glass for mounting.
When a user touches the surface, the system records the change in the electric current that flows through the display.

Dispersive-signal technology measures the piezoelectric effect—the voltage generated when mechanical force is applied to a material—that occurs chemically when a strengthened glass substrate is touched.

There are two infrared-based approaches. In one, an array of sensors detects a finger touching or almost touching the display, thereby interrupting infrared light beams projected over the screen. In the other, bottom-mounted infrared cameras record heat from screen touches.

In each case, the system determines the intended command based on the controls showing on the screen at the time and the location of the touch.

Development
The development of multi-touch screens facilitated the tracking of more than one finger on the screen; thus, operations that require more than one finger are possible. These devices also allow multiple users to interact with the touchscreen simultaneously.

With the growing use of touchscreens, the cost of touchscreen technology is routinely absorbed into the products that incorporate it and is nearly eliminated. Touchscreen technology has demonstrated reliability and is found in airplanes, automobiles, gaming consoles, machine control systems, appliances, and handheld display devices including cellphones; the touchscreen market for mobile devices was projected to produce US$5 billion by 2009.

The ability to accurately point on the screen itself is also advancing with the emerging graphics tablet-screen hybrids. Polyvinylidene fluoride (PVDF) plays a major role in this innovation due its high piezoelectric properties, which allow the tablet to sense pressure, making such things as digital painting behave more like paper and pencil.

TapSense, announced in October 2011, allows touchscreens to distinguish what part of the hand was used for input, such as the fingertip, knuckle and fingernail. This could be used in a variety of ways, for example, to copy and paste, to capitalize letters, to activate different drawing modes, etc.

Ergonomics and usage

Touchscreen enable
For touchscreens to be effective input devices, users must be able to accurately select targets and avoid accidental selection of adjacent targets. The design of touchscreen interfaces should reflect technical capabilities of the system, ergonomics, cognitive psychology and human physiology.

Guidelines for touchscreen designs were first developed in the 2000s, based on early research and actual use of older systems, typically using infrared grids—which were highly dependent on the size of the user's fingers. These guidelines are less relevant for the bulk of modern touch devices which use capacitive or resistive touch technology.

From the mid-2000s, makers of operating systems for smartphones have promulgated standards, but these vary between manufacturers, and allow for significant variation in size based on technology changes, so are unsuitable from a human factors perspective.

Much more important is the accuracy humans have in selecting targets with their finger or a pen stylus. The accuracy of user selection varies by position on the screen: users are most accurate at the center, less so at the left and right edges, and least accurate at the top edge and especially the bottom edge. Users are subconsciously aware of this, and take more time to select targets which are smaller or at the edges or corners of the touchscreen.

This user inaccuracy is a result of parallax, visual acuity and the speed of the feedback loop between the eyes and fingers. The precision of the human finger alone is much, much higher than this, so when assistive technologies are provided—such as on-screen magnifiers—users can move their finger (once in contact with the screen) with precision as small as 0.1 mm (0.004 in).

Hand position, digit used and switching
Users of handheld and portable touchscreen devices hold them in a variety of ways, and routinely change their method of holding and selection to suit the position and type of input. There are four basic types of handheld interaction:
 Holding at least in part with both hands, tapping with a single thumb
 Holding with two hands and tapping with both thumbs
 Holding with one hand, tapping with the finger (or rarely, thumb) of another hand
 Holding the device in one hand, and tapping with the thumb from that same hand

Use rates vary widely. While two-thumb tapping is encountered rarely (1–3%) for many general interactions, it is used for 41% of typing interaction.

In addition, devices are often placed on surfaces (desks or tables) and tablets especially are used in stands. The user may point, select or gesture in these cases with their finger or thumb, and vary use of these methods.

Combined with haptics
Touchscreens are often used with haptic response systems. A common example of this technology is the vibratory feedback provided when a button on the touchscreen is tapped. Haptics are used to improve the user's experience with touchscreens by providing simulated tactile feedback, and can be designed to react immediately, partly countering on-screen response latency. Research from the University of Glasgow (Brewster, Chohan, and Brown, 2007; and more recently Hogan) demonstrates that touchscreen users reduce input errors (by 20%), increase input speed (by 20%), and lower their cognitive load (by 40%) when touchscreens are combined with haptics or tactile feedback. On top of this, a study conducted in 2013 by Boston College explored the effects that touchscreens haptic stimulation had on triggering psychological ownership of a product. Their research concluded that a touchscreens ability to incorporate high amounts of haptic involvement resulted in customers feeling more endowment to the products they were designing or buying. The study also reported that consumers using a touchscreen were willing to accept a higher price point for the items they were purchasing.

Customer service
Touchscreen technology has become integrated into many aspects of customer service industry in the 21st century. The restaurant industry is a good example of touchscreen implementation into this domain. Chain restaurants such as Taco Bell, Panera Bread, and McDonald's offer touchscreens as an option when customers are ordering items off the menu. While the addition of touchscreens is a development for this industry, customers may choose to bypass the touchscreen and order from a traditional cashier. To take this a step further, a restaurant in Bangalore has attempted to completely automate the ordering process. Customers sit down to a table embedded with touchscreens and order off an extensive menu. Once the order is placed it is sent electronically to the kitchen. These types of touchscreens fit under the Point of Sale (POS) systems mentioned in the lead section.

"Gorilla arm"
Extended use of gestural interfaces without the ability of the user to rest their arm is referred to as "gorilla arm". It can result in fatigue, and even repetitive stress injury when routinely used in a work setting. Certain early pen-based interfaces required the operator to work in this position for much of the workday. Allowing the user to rest their hand or arm on the input device or a frame around it is a solution for this in many contexts. This phenomenon is often cited as an example of movements to be minimized by proper ergonomic design.

Unsupported touchscreens are still fairly common in applications such as ATMs and data kiosks, but are not an issue as the typical user only engages for brief and widely spaced periods.

Fingerprints

Touchscreens can suffer from the problem of fingerprints on the display. This can be mitigated by the use of materials with optical coatings designed to reduce the visible effects of fingerprint oils. Most modern smartphones have oleophobic coatings, which lessen the amount of oil residue. Another option is to install a matte-finish anti-glare screen protector, which creates a slightly roughened surface that does not easily retain smudges.

Glove touch
Capacitive touchscreens do not work most of the time when the user wears gloves. The thickness of the glove and the material they are made of play a significant role on that and the ability of a touchscreen to pick up a touch.

Some devices have a mode which increases the sensitivity of the touchscreen. This allows the touchscreen to be used more reliably with gloves, but can also result in unreliable and phantom inputs.

See also

 Dual-touchscreen
 Pen computing
 Energy harvesting
 Flexible keyboard
 Gestural interface
 Graphics tablet
 Light pen
 List of touch-solution manufacturers
 Lock screen
 Tablet computer
 Touch switch
 Touchscreen remote control
 Multi-touch
 Omnitouch
 Pointing device gesture
 Sensacell
 SixthSense
 Nintendo DS

References

Sources

External links

American inventions
European inventions
 
Display devices